The 1999 Philadelphia Wings season marked the team's thirteenth season of operation.

Regular season

Conference standings

Game log
Reference:

Playoffs

Game log
Reference:

Roster
Reference:

See also
 Philadelphia Wings
 1999 NLL season

References

Philadelphia Wings seasons
Philly
1999 in lacrosse